The 1930 Stetson Hatters football team represented Stetson College as a member the Southern Intercollegiate Athletic Association (SIAA) during the 1930 college football season. Led by seventh-year head coach Herb McQuillan, the Hatters compiled an overall record of 5–3, with a mark of 3–3 in conference play.

Schedule

References

Stetson
Stetson Hatters football seasons
Stetson Hatters football